Shatakshee Ramesh Dhongde is an associate professor at the School of Economics, Ivan Allen College of Liberal Arts, Georgia Institute of Technology. She has provided research papers to the several institutions including the International Monetary Fund and the World Institute for Development Economics Research (WIDER). Her work has also appeared in several academic journals including World Development.

Dhongde's research interests are in microeconomics and development economics and include inequality, growth, trade liberalization, poverty, and segregation.

Education 

Dhongde gained her degree in economics from the University of Pune, India (1997), her masters in economics from Gokhale Institute of Politics and Economics, also in Pune, India (1999), and her Ph.D. in economics from the University of California, Riverside, in the United States (2005).

Career 
After completing her PhD, Dhongde remained at the University of California, Riverside for a further year as a lecturer. In 2006 she became assistant professor at Rochester Institute of Technology, Rochester, New York. Dhongde became assistant professor at Georgia Institute of Technology, Atlanta in 2011.

Dhongde was also a visiting scholar at the United Nations University-World Institute for Development Economics Research (UNU-WIDER) in Helsinki from June to September 2002.

Awards 
 2005 University of California, Riverside Graduate Research Award
 2012 The Nancy and Richard Ruggles Research Prize presented by the International Association for Research in Income and Wealth (IARIW)

Bibliography

Thesis

Chapters in books 

 
Also available online: 
 
Also available online: 
Also known as: The International Studies Association Compendium on Global Development

Journal articles 
 
 
  Pdf. Working paper no. 133, prepared for the Chronic Poverty Research Centre (CPRC) Conference, Brooks World Poverty Institute, University of Manchester, 8–10 September 2010.
 
 
  Pdf.

Papers 
  Working paper.
  Pdf  Research paper 2004/53.
 
 
  Working paper.
  Pdf. BWPI working paper 133, prepared for the Chronic Poverty Research Centre (CPRC) Conference, 8–10 September 2010. 
  Pdf.  Working paper 11/234.
  Spring Seminar Series.
  Spring Seminar Series.
  Paper prepared for the 32nd General Conference of The International Association for Research in Income and Wealth (IARIW).
  Pdf. Working paper no. 290.
  Paper prepared for the 33rd General Conference of The International Association for Research in Income and Wealth (IARIW).

Videos 
  MP4 download or view online. A workshop-style mini-retreat on common areas of research within Ivan Allen College (IAC), Georgia Institute of Technology.

References

External links 
 Profile: Shatakshee Dhongde Network for Women Faculty, Ivan Allen College of Liberal Arts, Georgia Institute of Technology
 Profile: Shatakshee Dhongde School of Economics Faculty, Ivan Allen College of Liberal Arts, Georgia Institute of Technology

Indian development economists
Feminist economists
Georgia Tech faculty
Living people
Microeconomists
Place of birth missing (living people)
University of California, Riverside alumni
University of California, Riverside faculty
Savitribai Phule Pune University alumni
Year of birth missing (living people)
Indian women economists
21st-century Indian economists
21st-century Indian women scientists
Women scientists from Maharashtra